James Francis Burke (April 15, 1923 – June 26, 1981) was an American cornet soloist. He was the principal cornet soloist with the Goldman Band from 1943 to 1974. He was also the principal trumpet with The Baltimore Symphony Orchestra from 1943 to 1949. Mr. Burke, who had the use of only one arm, was considered the greatest virtuoso of his time on the instrument, according to Ainslee Cox, conductor of the Guggenheim Memorial Band.

Early life

James Francis (Jimmy) Burke was born in Port Jefferson, New York, the son of Robert Arthur Burke (1895–1977) and Helen Marguerite Goebel (1899–1956). Robert was a mason contractor who also played the trumpet. He is credited with building the high school and telephone building in Port Jefferson. Helen was a pianist, and together they had their own dance band.

At his birth, Jimmy sustained a brachial plexus injury, rendering his right arm useless. He began to play the trumpet at age 5, but since he could not hold the horn, his father had a tripod stand built for him. The top of it was shaped like a horseshoe and the horn would sit in that stand with a strap going over it in front of the valves. The stand was on rollers and could also be raised and lowered like a music stand.

When he was seven years old, he started performing for the Rotary Club and for different organizations. In 1936 he played on WJZ (AM) on Sunday mornings from 9 to 10 o'clock. The program was called "Coast To Coast On A Bus" and Milton Cross was the announcer. Then from 11 to 12 o'clock, he went to ABC (which was CBS at that time) to The Horn and Hardart Children's Hour. Paul Douglas (actor) was the announcer. Jimmy played on these 2 shows for 7 years, playing 2 different solos every morning. When he was 13, some of the participants from The Horn and Hardart Children's Hour made a movie for Warner Brothers called "Stars Of Tomorrow". In the film, 5 boys make up a hillbilly band.

Education
Jimmy's first teacher was his father from the age of 5 until the age of 13. He then studied with Del Staigers in 1936 and 1937. Lessons were conducted at Staigers' apartment in Sunnyside, Queens, New York. He regarded Staigers as the greatest player he had ever heard. It was Staigers who suggested to the King Musical Instrument Company that they build a cornet for left handed playing. Jimmy then studied with John "Ned" Mahoney, a cornetist with The Goldman Band and a graduate of The Ernest Williams School of Music. From 1938 through 1943 Burke attended Ernest Williams School of Music at 153 Ocean Avenue Brooklyn, New York. During those 6 summers, he attended The Ernest Williams Band Camp at Saugerties, New York.

The Goldman Band
From 1943 to 1974 Jimmy was the principle cornet soloist and solo chair with The Goldman Band. During his 32-year career, he was contracted to play five solos each week. The band performed seven nights a week with 50 concerts in a summer season. All totaled, Jimmy performed over 1,100 solos with The Goldman Band. He had a prodigious memory for music and rarely read from sheet music during a performance.

Baltimore Symphony Orchestra
In 1943 Jimmy moved to Baltimore and began a seven-year stint as principle trumpet with the Baltimore Symphony Orchestra as well as the Professor of Trumpet at Peabody Conservatory and Conductor of the band. During the summers, he took the train to New York City to play with The Goldman Band.

Cities Service Band of America

Upon his return from Baltimore in 1950, Jimmy received a call from Paul Lavalle who asked him to join his band. Jimmy stayed with the band for six years. He had a featured solo performance of "The Carnival of Venice" on the RCA Victor LP "A Sunday Band Concert".

All-Star Concert Band
In 1960 he co-founded The All-Star Concert Band with American tubist Harvey Phillips. The band recorded 2 LPs under the Golden Crest label. The first, titled "The All-Star Concert Band" was recorded September 17–18, 1960 at the Huntington Theatre, Huntington, New York. The second LP titled "The Burke-Phillips All-Star Concert Band" was recorded a year later.

Awards
National Champion, 1939 National Trumpet Competition
New York Brass Conference For Scholarships
Associated Musicians of Greater New York Local 802
Port Jefferson High School Wall of Fame

Death
On June 26, 1981 Jimmy suffered a massive heart attack while conducting a rehearsal of The Guggenheim Memorial Band, the successor to The Goldman Band. He was interred in the family plot at Cedar Hill Cemetery, Port Jefferson, New York.

Discography
Solo Recordings
 1954 National Music Contest Selections (1954) [Polymusic PR/EE 101]
 Horn of Plenty (1957) [Decca 8489]
 Clinician Series (1960) [Golden Crest CRG-1004]
 The All-Star Concert Band (1960)  [Golden Crest CR-4025]
 The Burke-Phillips All-Star Concert Band (1961) [Golden Crest CR-4040]
Artist Workshop Series
 The Magic Trumpet (1958) [Artist Workshop Series AWS 101]
 Tropical Trumpets (1959) [Artist Workshop Series AWS 102] (Trumpet trio with Jack Holland and Ted Weis)
 Introduction and Tarentella (1959) [Artist Workshop Series AWS 103]
 Bright Eyes (Trio) (1959) [Artist Workshop Series AWS 104] (Trumpet trio with Jack Holland and Ted Weis)

With The Goldman Band
 America Marches (1947) [Regent MG-6021]
 Sousa - Goldman Marches (1949) [Columbia CL 6080]
 On The Mall (1951) [Decca DL-5386]
 America Marches (1955) [RCA Camden – CAL-125]
 On Parade! (1955) [Decca DL 5546]
 Here Comes the Band! (1955) [Decca DL 8185]
 I Love to Hear a Band (1957) [Decca DL 8445]
 Semper Fidelis - The Marches of John Philip Sousa (1957) [Harmony HL 7001]
 Band Masterpieces (1958) [Decca DL 8633]
 The Sound of the Goldman Band (post 1959) [Decca DL 8931]
 Golden March Favorites (1960) [Decca DL 4453]
 Sousa Marches in Hi Fi (1960) [Decca DL 8807]
 Cavalcade of the American Band (1962) [Capitol W 1688]
 Marching Along Together (1963) [Decca DL 4450]
With Leroy Anderson
 Leroy Anderson Conducts His Music (1951) [MCA 531] (Featured Soloist on "A Trumpeter's Lullaby")
 Leroy Anderson Conducts Leroy Anderson (1954) [MCA 555] ("Bugler's Holiday" trumpet trio with Raymond Crisara and John Ware)
With Archie Bleyer
 S'il Vous Plait (1954)  [Cadence 1241]
With Robert Russell Bennett
 Victory at Sea  (1955)  [RCA Victor Red Seal LM 1779]
With Paul Lavalle
 America's Favorite Marches  (1951) [RCA Victor LPM-6]
 A Sunday Band Concert  (1953) [RCA Victor LPM-3120]  (Featured Soloist "The Carnival of Venice")
 "The Carnival of Venice"  (1953) [RCA Victor 47-5203] (Vinyl, 7" 45RPM)
 Lavalle at Work  (1954) [RCA Victor LPM-1026]
 Great Band Music  (1955) [RCA Victor LPM-1133]
With Morton Gould
 Hi Fi Band Concert (Columbia Concert Band) (1956) [Columbia CL 954]
 Brass and Percussion (1957) [RCA Victor 09026-61255-2]
 The Band Plays On (Columbia Concert Band) (circa 1959) [Columbia Masterworks AL 57]
With Robert Shaw
 Mass in B Minor  (1960) [RCA Victor Red Seal LSC-6157]
With Igor Stravinsky
 The Rite of Spring (1960) [Columbia MS-6319]
With Andre Kostelanetz (see notes)
 Wonderland of Sound - Star Spangled Marches (1962) [Columbia CS-8518]
 The Thunderer - The Spectacular Sound of John Philip Sousa (1965) [Columbia CS-9159]

With Thomas Schippers 
(Unknown - See notes)

With Leopold Stokowski
(Unknown - See notes)
 Notes - According to his self published resume, James F. Burke played on "many recordings conducted by Stokowski, Morton Gould, Andre Kostelanetz and Thomas Schippers". In the early days of recordings, musicians rarely (if ever) received credit in the liner notes of album jackets so it is unknown for certain on which albums Mr. Burke performed. In the case of Morton Gould, credit was given to musicians on the album jacket. In the case of Andre Kostelanetz, his overall discography suggests that the two albums listed are where Jimmy would most likely have been contracted to perform.

Broadway shows
My Fair Lady
Oklahoma!
Song Of Norway
The Music Man
Cabaret
I Do! I Do!
The Rothschilds (musical)
George M
South Pacific

Television shows
Wide, Wide World with Dave Garroway  NBC
Tic Tac Dough  NBC
Dough Re Mi  with Gene Rayburn NBC
Twenty-One with Jack Barry NBC
Thy Kingdom Come (Harriss Hubble)  NBC
The Jackie Gleason Show CBS

Faculty positions
Peabody Conservatory 1943-1949
Ithaca College 1957-1961
University of Bridgeport 1978-1979
Hofstra University 1974-1981
Manhattan School of Music 1980-1981 (he taught (briefly) in the MSM Preparatory Division.)

Published works
Cornet/trumpet solos
 The Runaway Trumpet (1952) Mercury Music Corporation (www.presser.com)
 Hocus Polka (1952) Mercury Music Corporation(www.presser.com)
 Prom Waltz (1952) Mercury Music Corporation(www.presser.com)
 Serenade In 6/8 (1952) Mercury Music Corporation(www.presser.com)
 Strictly GI (1952) Mercury Music Corporation(www.presser.com)
 Twilight Tune (1952) Mercury Music Corporation(www.presser.com)
 The Magic Trumpet (1955) Carl Fischer
 Begine (1956) Chas. Colin
 Caprice (1956) Chas. Colin
 Joneta (1956) Chas. Colin
 Amourette (1959) Carl Fischer
 Danza Allegre (1960) Carl Fischer
 Jolene (1963) Chas. Colin
 Jimala Beguine (1964) Carl Fischer

Method book
 New Directions In Tonguing (1956) Chas. Colin

Unpublished works
 Eventide
 Zorita (1968)

References

Sources
 Baltimore Symphony Orchestra Trumpet Section - View topic: Trumpet Herald forum
 Edwin Franko Goldman | WNYC | New York Public Radio, Podcasts, Live Streaming Radio, News (Edwin Franko Goldman mentions James Burke beginning at approximately 13:00.)

External links
 James F. Burke - Cornet Soloist - YouTube
 Burke, James  - Discography of American Recordings

1923 births
1981 deaths
American cornetists
American bandleaders
20th-century classical musicians
Cornet
Port Jefferson, New York
People from Port Jefferson, New York